John Hiram Haycock (1759-1830) was an architect who built many notable buildings in Shropshire and Montgomeryshire. He was the son of William Haycock (1725-1802), a carpenter and joiner of Shrewsbury. He was apprenticed to his father and became a freeman of the Shrewsbury Carpenters’ and Bricklayers’ Company in 1796. From about 1814 he worked in partnership with his son Edward Haycock, Sr., and became the Shropshire county surveyor in 1824.

Architectural works

Public buildings
 Cross Houses. The Atcham Union Workhouse.
 Shrewsbury, The Guildhall and Shirehall. 1783-85. Demolished 1835, as the foundations were unstable.
 Shrewsbury Millington’s Hospital, Frankwell. Almshouse.  Built in 1748, but altered by Haycock in 1782.
 Shrewsbury The County Gaol 1787-93. Designed by Haycock, but built by Thomas Telford.
 Preston upon the Weald Moors, Preston Hospital.  A former Almshouse.  Added wings and outer pavilion buildings in 1827.  J H and E Haycock.

Schools
 Shrewsbury Allatt’s Charity School, Murivance. Classical facade by Haycock, 1799-1800.
 Shrewsbury. Former Shrewsbury School building now Shrewsbury Library. Altered by John and Edward Haycock in 1815. 
 Shrewsbury. Former Shrewsbury School Headmaster’s House, School Lane.

Church

 Berriew Church, Montgomeryshire. Reconstructed Church in 1803-4.

Country houses

 Oakly Park, Bromfield, Shropshire.  Remodelled by Haycock (1784–90) and later by C R Cockerell.
 Oakley House
 Moreton Corbet Castle. Unexecuted designs 1796.
 Shawbury, Acton Reynald Hall. Enlarged 1800
 Oswestry Sweeney Hall 1805. Built for T N Parker.  Bland, ashlar faced block, with massive pilasters.
 Forden, Montgomeryshire. Gunley Hall 1810. Porch with Ionic columns.
 Lydham, The Roveries. Stuccoed villa of 1810 for John Oakley.
 Claverley, Chyknell. Villa style house 1814.
 Ruyton-XI-Towns, Pradoe. Enlarged 1817.
 Stanage Park, Radnorshire. Haycock appears to have acted as a building contractor for John Adey Repton
 Glandyfi Castle, built 1820. Attributed to Haycock on the basis of its similarities to Stanage Park.

Gallery of work by J. H.  Haycock

References

Literature
 Colvin H. (2008), A Biographical Dictionary of British Architects 1600-1840 Yale University Press, 4th edition London.
 J Newman and N Pevsner, (2006), The Buildings of England: Shropshire, Yale.
 
 R Scourfield and R Haslam, (2013), "The Buildings of Wales: Powys; Montgomeryshire, Radnorshire and Breconshire'', Yale University Press.

External links

1759 births
1830 deaths
Architects from Shrewsbury